Mark DeSantis may refer to:

Mark DeSantis (businessman) (born 1959), American entrepreneur and political pundit
Mark DeSantis (ice hockey) (born 1972), Canadian ice hockey defenceman and coach
Marko DeSantis (born 1972), American lead guitarist for rock band Sugarcult
Mark DeSantis, professor of finance, see Gunduz Caginalp
Mark DeSantis, outside linebacker with the 1976, 1977, and 1978 Michigan Wolverines football teams